The Xplorer XS is a South African paramotor that was designed by Keith Pickersgill and produced by Xplorer UltraFlight of Cape Town for powered paragliding. Now out of production, when it was available the aircraft was supplied complete and ready-to-fly.

Design and development
The XS was designed to comply with the US FAR 103 Ultralight Vehicles rules as well as European regulations. It features a paraglider-style wing, single-place accommodation and a single  Solo 210 engine in pusher configuration with a 2.5:1 ratio reduction drive and a  diameter two-bladed wooden propeller. The cage assembly breaks down into four parts for ground transport and storage. The aircraft is built from annealed aluminium.

As is the case with all paramotors, take-off and landing is accomplished by foot. Inflight steering is accomplished via handles that actuate the canopy brakes, creating roll and yaw.

Specifications (XS)

See also
Xplorer Xflyer, another paramotor design from the same manufacturer

References

XS
2000s South African ultralight aircraft
Single-engined pusher aircraft
Paramotors